This is a list of hospitals in the Netherlands.

University and supra-regional hospitals
All hospitals listed here are also listed under their respective provinces.
The eight university hospitals offer the highest level of care available in the Netherlands. Each of these hospitals offers specialized services such as neurosurgery, cardiac surgery, a high-level emergency department, advanced oncology, departments for infectious diseases, and other services generally not found in smaller hospitals.
University hospitals 
 Amsterdam University Medical Center  Amsterdam UMC  (AUMC), Amsterdam, merger of the VU University Medical Center (VUmc) and Acadamic Medical Center (AMC)
 University Medical Center Groningen Universitair Medisch Centrum Groningen (UMCG), Groningen
 University Medical Center Utrecht Universitair Medisch Centrum Utrecht (UMCU), Utrecht
 Leiden University Medical Center Leids Universitair Medisch Centrum (LUMC), Leiden
 Radboud University Nijmegen Medical Centre Radboudumc (also: UMC Nijmegen, Universitair Medisch Centrum St. Radboud), Nijmegen
 Maastricht UMC+ Maastricht Universitair Medisch Centrum  (MUMC+), Maastricht
 Erasmus MC Erasmus MC, Rotterdam
Non-university major "top-clinical" hospitals
A level and type of care similar to that offered by university hospitals is offered by a number of large hospitals which are not directly affiliated with a university, though these hospitals tend to be somewhat smaller. These hospitals are frequently referred to as "top-clinical" centers.
 Albert Schweitzer Ziekenhuis, Dordrecht
Amphia Ziekenhuis, Breda
Canisius-Wilhelemina Ziekenhuis, Nijmegen
Catharina Ziekenhuis, Eindhoven
Deventer Ziekenhuis, Deventer
Elisabeth-TweeSteden Ziekenhuis Tilburg, Tilburg
Franciscus Gasthuis & Vlietland, Rotterdam
Gelre ziekenhuizen, Apeldoorn
 Haaglanden Medisch Centrum (Westeinde location), The Hague
HagaZiekenhuis, The Hague
Isala Klinieken, Zwolle
Jeroen Bosch Hospital, Den Bosch
Maasstad Ziekenhuis, Rotterdam
Martini Ziekenhuis, Groningen
Maxima Medisch Centrum, Veldhoven
Meander Medisch Centrum, Amersfoort
Medisch Centrum Leeuwarden, Leeuwarden
Medisch Spectrum Twente, Enschede
Noordwest Ziekenhuisgroep, Alkmaar
OLVG, Amsterdam
Reinier de Graaf Gasthuis, Delft
Rijnstate, Arnhem
Spaarne Gasthuis, Haarlem
St. Antonius Ziekenhuis, Nieuwegein and Utrecht
VieCurie Medisch centrum voor Noord Limburg, Venlo
Zuyderland Medisch Centrum, Heerlen

Hospitals in Drenthe
Scheperziekenhuis, Emmen
Wilhelminaziekenhuis, Assen
Ziekenhuis Bethesda, Hoogeveen
Diaconessenhuis, Meppel

Hospitals in Flevoland
Flevoziekenhuis, Almere
Zuiderzeeziekenhuis, Lelystad
Dokter J.H. Jansenziekenhuis, Emmeloord

Hospitals in Friesland
Nijsmellinghe Ziekenhuis, Drachten
Ziekenhuis De Tjongerschans, Heerenveen
Medisch Centrum Leeuwarden (MCL), Leeuwarden (top-clinical center)
Antonius Ziekenhuis, Sneek

Hospitals in Gelderland
Universitair Medisch Centrum St Radboud (also: UMC Nijmegen) (UMCN), Nijmegen
Canisius-Wilhelmina Ziekenhuis (CWZ), Nijmegen
Ziekenhuis Rijnstate - Arnhem
Gelre Ziekenhuizen, Lukas, Apeldoorn
Gelre Ziekenhuizen, Spittaal, Zutphen
Slingeland Ziekenhuis,  Doetinchem
Streekziekenhuis Koningin Beatrix, Winterswijk
Streekziekenhuis Rivierenland, Tiel
Ziekenhuis Velp, Velp
Ziekenhuis Zevenaar, Zevenaar
Ziekenhuis Gelderse Vallei, Ede
Ziekenhuis Sint Jansdal, Harderwijk

Hospitals in Groningen
Universitair Medisch Centrum Groningen (UMCG), Groningen
Delfzicht Ziekenhuis, Delfzijl
Refaja Ziekenhuis, Stadskanaal
Martiniziekenhuis, Groningen (also Burn Care Center)
Sint Lucas Ziekenhuis, Winschoten

Hospitals in Limburg
Maastricht UMC+ (MUMC+), Maastricht
Atrium Medisch Centrum, Heerlen
Vie Curie Medisch Centrum, Venlo/Venray
Orbis Medisch Centrum, Sittard
St. Jans Gasthuis, Weert
Laurentius Ziekenhuis, Roermond

Hospitals in North Brabant
Ziekenhuis Lievensberg - Bergen op Zoom
Amphia Hospital - Breda
Catharina-Ziekenhuis - Eindhoven
Máxima Medisch Centrum - Eindhoven
Elkerliek ziekenhuis - Helmond
Jeroen Bosch Ziekenhuis - 's-Hertogenbosch
Franciscus Ziekenhuis Roosendaal - Roosendaal 
St. Elisabeth Hospital - Tilburg
TweeSteden Hospital - Tilburg
 - Boxmeer
Bernhoven Ziekenhuis - Uden

Hospitals in North Holland
Hospitals in Amsterdam
Vrije Universiteit Medisch Centrum (VUMC)
Antoni van Leeuwenhoekziekenhuis (AVL)
Academisch Medisch Centrum (AMC)
Onze Lieve Vrouwe Gasthuis 
BovenIJ Ziekenhuis 
Sint Lucas Andreas Ziekenhuis 
Slotervaartziekenhuis
Hospitals in other parts of North Holland
Ziekenhuis Amstelland - Amstelveen
Medical Center Alkmaar (MCA) - Alkmaar (top-clinical center)
Rode Kruis Ziekenhuis - Beverwijk
Gemini Ziekenhuis - Den Helder
Kennemer Gasthuis - Haarlem
Tergooi - Blaricum
Tergooi - Hilversum
Spaarne Ziekenhuis - Heemstede and Hoofddorp
Dijklander Ziekenhuis - Hoorn
Dijklander Ziekenhuis - Purmerend
Zaans Medisch Centrum (previously called De Heel) - Zaandam

Hospitals in Overijssel
 Medisch Spectrum Twente, Enschede (top-clinical center)
 Isala Klinieken, Zwolle (top-clinical center)
 Ziekenhuisgroep Twente, Almelo (formerly Twenteborg ziekenhuis ) Almelo
 Ziekenhuisgroep Twente, Hengelo (formerly Streekziekenhuis Midden-Twente ) Hengelo
 Deventer Ziekenhuis, Deventer
 Röpcke-Zweers Ziekenhuis, Hardenberg

Hospitals in Utrecht
 Universitair Medisch Centrum Utrecht (UMCU), Utrecht
 St. Antonius Ziekenhuis - Nieuwegein
 St. Antonius Ziekenhuis - Utrecht
 Diakonessenhuis - Utrecht
 Diakonessenhuis - Zeist
 Zuwe Hofpoort Ziekenhuis Woerden
 Meander Medisch Centrum Amersfoort

Hospitals in Zeeland
 Admiral de Ruyter Ziekenhuis, Goes Vlissingen
 Ziekenhuis Walcheren, Vlissingen

Hospitals in South Holland
 Albert Schweitzer Ziekenhuis, Dordrecht
 Bronovo Hospital, The Hague
 Beatrix Ziekenhuis, Gorinchem
 Diaconessenhuis, Leiden
 Erasmus MC, Rotterdam
 Groene Hart Ziekenhuis, Gouda
 HagaZiekenhuis, The Hague
 Havenziekenhuis, Rotterdam
 IJsselland Ziekenhuis, Capelle aan den IJssel
 Leiden University Medical Center (LUMC), Leiden
 Maasstad Ziekenhuis, Rotterdam
 Medisch Centrum Haaglanden (formerly Westeinde Ziekenhuis), The Hague
 Reinier de Graaf Gasthuis (formerly Sint Hippolytus Ziekenhuis and Bethel Ziekenhuis), Delft
 Sint Franciscus Gasthuis, Rotterdam
 Vlietland Ziekenhuis  Schiedam

References

Netherlands, the
Hospitals
 List
Netherlands